Anastasia Alekseyevna Rygalina (born 31 January 1996) is a Russian cross-country skier. She competed in the  Women's 10 kilometre classical, and Women's 15 kilometre skiathlon, at the 2022 Winter Olympics.

She competed in the 2021–22 FIS Cross-Country World Cup.

Cross-country skiing results
All results are sourced from the International Ski Federation (FIS).

Olympic Games

World Cup

Season standings

Notes

References 

1996 births
Living people
Russian female cross-country skiers
Cross-country skiers at the 2022 Winter Olympics
Olympic cross-country skiers of Russia